Welcome to… Brazzaville is a best of songs album by the indie group Brazzaville. It was released in two editions. At first, it was put together when only three albums of the Brazzavile were recorded; the next time Welcome to… was released in Russia—after Hastings Street became available—so Welcome to... now had songs from the four albums, a different track list and two additional non-album songs (four in sum).

About the album 

"Trey Spruance from Mimicry records approached me with the idea," says David Brown, the leader of the Brazzaville, "of putting out a record that would introduce Brazzaville to a wider audience."

Welcome to… Brazzaville features songs from the first three/four records as well as a couple of new ones ("Love Sky", "Christmas in East Cirebon" and later "Last Days", "Hotel Ukraina").

""Love Sky" is the story of my mother and father and of distant memories I have of going to work with my father when he was still a trucker, hauling shipping containers from Long Beach and San Pedro to the train yards in Vernon.

"Christmas in EC" is about a couple of young low budget travelers whose lovely existence gets destroyed by heroin."

Track listing
 2004 release 

The original release of Welcome to… Brazzaville by Web of Mimicry

 "Super Gizi"
 "Foreign Disaster Days"
 "Boeing"
 "Casa Batllo"
 "Queenie"
 "Genoa"
 "Motel Room"
 "Voce"
 "Sewers of Bangkok"
 "Rainy Night"
 "4 AM Osaka"
 "Christmas in E.C." [fully Christmas in East Cirebon, a non-album track]
 "Xanax and 3 Hours of T.V."
 "Love Sky" [non-album track]
 "High Life"

 2005 (Russian) release 

Reissue by Zakat (Soyuz Records)

 "Last Days" [non-album track]
 "Hotel Ukraina" [non-album track]
 "Super Gizi"
 "Foreign Disaster Days"
 "Night Train to Moscow"
 "Casa Batllo"
 "Queenie"
 "Londres"
 "Genoa"
 "Motel Room"
 "Lagos Slums"
 "Voce"
 "Sewers of Bangkok"
 "Christmas in E.C." [non-album track]
 "Love Sky" [non-album track''']
 "Rollin Easy." This track is a full version of Intro and Interlude'' released in Hastings Street album.

Non-album tracks are referred to as "Special Collector Tracks" on the back cover of the album.

External links 
 Brazzaville official discography
 Sponsor a needy child for christmas 

Brazzaville (American band) albums
2004 albums
2005 albums